The tribe Griffineae (in the family Amaryllidaceae, subfamily Amaryllidoideae) includes 2 genera with 22 species from South America which are actually endemic to Brazil. A typical character of the representatives of the tribe are the flowers - They are with blue or lilac color collected into an umbel. Only the members of this tribe and the genus Lycoris are able to form flowers with such color in the whole family Amaryllidaceae.  The plants in this group are typical perennial flowers which are producing bulbs. The leaves are green, with elliptical form in the most of the cases but in some members as in Worsleya they are sword-shaped.

Taxonomy 
The Müller-Doblies' (1996) placed Griffinia in its own subtribe Griffiniinae (of tribe Hippeastreae) and did not recognise Worsleya, which they submerged in Phycella. In contrast, Meerow and Snijman (1998) resurrected it, placing both genera within Hippeastreae. Subsequently, molecular phylogenetic studies demonstrated that Griffineae was a distinct and separate tribe.

Phylogeny 
The placement of Griffineae within subfamily Amaryllidoideae is shown in the 
following cladogram, where this tribe is shown as a sister group to the Hippeastreae, forming the Hippeastroid subclade, of two American clades:

Subdivision 
Two genera:
 Griffinia
 Worsleya

References

Bibliography

 
 
 
 . (additional excerpts)

External links 

Amaryllidoideae
Asparagales tribes